The 2000/01 Portuguese football season saw a new champion: Boavista FC became the 5th club ever to win the championship, securing the title in the 33rd of 34 rounds.

Primeira Liga

External links
 Final Table

 
Seasons in Portuguese football
Football
Football